Sandnes is a village in Bygland municipality in Agder county, Norway. The village is located on a small flat area between the lake Åraksfjorden to the west and the steep mountainside to the east. The small village had about 80 residents in 1845, but in 2009, there were only 12 residents living here.

Historically, the Sandnes Church was located in this village, right on the shore of the lake, but in 1935, the church was taken down and moved to the nearby village of Åraksbø, where more of the parish's residents lived. This led to some hard feelings among the people in Sandnes, which later led to the building of a small chapel on the site of the old church.

References

Villages in Agder
Bygland